Laza may refer to:

Places 
Laza, Qabala, a village in Qabala Rayon, Azerbaijan
Laza, Qusar, a village in Qusar Rayon, Azerbaijan
Laza, Spain, a municipality in the province of Ourense, Galicia region of north-west Spain
Laza mine, an open pit mine near the municipality
Laza, Vaslui, a commune in Vaslui County, Romania
Laža parish, an administrative unit of Aizpute Municipality, Latvia
Laza River, a river tributary in Romania

People 
Laza Kostić (1842–1909), Serbian writer, philosopher, and politician
Laza Lazarević (1851–1891), Serbian writer, psychiatrist, and neurologist
Laza Morgan (born 1978), Jamaican American reggae singer and rapper
Laza Ristovski (1956–2007), Serbian and former Yugoslav keyboardist
Belsy Laza (born 1967), Cuban former shot putter